Dejan Lazarević may refer to

 Dejan Lazarević (footballer born 1989), Serbian footballer for KF Apolonia Fier
 Dejan Lazarević (footballer) (born 1990), Slovenian footballer
 Dejan Lazarević (musician) (born before 2003), Serbian trumpeter
 Dejan Lazarević (singer) (born before 1994), Bosnian